The 311th Sustainment Command (Expeditionary) (ESC) is a subordinate command of 79th Sustainment Support Command.

Units
The command is made up of the following units:
 304th Sustainment Brigade
 304th Special Troops Battalion
 155th Combat Sustainment Support Battalion
 371st Combat Sustainment Support Battalion
 420th Transportation Battalion
 650th Regional Support Group
 469th Combat Sustainment Support Battalion
 483rd Transportation Battalion
 314th Transportation Battalion
 653rd Regional Support Group
 419th Combat Sustainment Support Battalion
 336th Combat Sustainment Support Battalion
 418th Quartermaster Battalion

References

311
311